Chain Lakes Reservoir is a reservoir in Alberta.

Lakes of Alberta
Municipal District of Ranchland No. 66